Nicola Masini (born 1965) is an Italian scientist with CNR, noted for his work on exploring traces of Andean civilizations in Peru and Bolivia using spatial technologies and Remote Sensing.

Biography 
He graduated in Engineering in 1990. He became Researcher with the Consiglio Nazionale delle Ricerche in 1995, Senior scientist at CNR-IBAM in 2003,  Research Director of CNR-Institute of heritage Science in 2020, Professor of Fundamentals of Restoration and Science for Conservation at the University of Basilicata since 2002. His dominant scientific interest is the application and the development of new approaches to archaeological research by integrating satellite remote sensing, LiDAR and geophysical prospecting.

He has been directing Italian Conservation heritage and Archaeogeophysics Mission in Peru since 2007. From 2007 to 2015, he has been directing several scientific investigations at the Nasca ceremonial center of Cahuachi, Pachacamac, Tiwanaku, Machu Picchu,  Chankillo and a number of archaeological sites in the Nasca Province and Lambayeque region.

The most remarkable achievements of the ITACA Mission  are the discovery of a settlement on the riverbed of the Nasca, a number of findings in some of the Cahuachi temples, the monitoring of archaeological looting in South and North Peru, and study of the ancient channeling in Pachacamac.
Nicola Masini, investigating some geoglyphs in Pampa de Atarco near the Ceremonial center of Cahuachi contributed to provide a new hypothesis on the Nasca lines. The research conducted using remote sensing, along with Giuseppe Orefici and Rosa Lasaponara,  put in evidence a spatial, functional and religious relationship between these geoglyphs and the temples of Cahuachi.
Since 2013, he has been chief advisor of a research project with the Chinese Academy of Sciences in Henan (China) focusing on the use of digital space technologies for archaeological investigations and the management of cultural resources. He is currently conducting investigations using satellite imagery, including SAR, to identify unknown sites and routes along the old Silk Road. Since 2005, in Southern Italy, he has been conducting some remote sensing-based investigations on medieval settlements abandoned in the Late Middle Ages. In 2018 using LiDAR he enabled to discover a fortified settlement under the canopy in North of Basilicata. In

Current research 
His scientific interest centers on the application and development of methodologies for the conservation of cultural heritage and archaeological research. His interdisciplinary approach draws on spatial technologies, non invasive diagnostics, and geophysics in a holistic vision that brings together history, archaeology, and conservation

Scientific books and papers

Books
 Lasaponara R., Masini N. (Eds) 2012, Satellite Remote Sensing: a new tool for Archaeology, Springer, Verlag Berlin Heidelberg, .
 Lasaponara R., Masini N., Orefici G. (Eds). The Ancient Nasca World New Insights from Science and Archaeology. Springer International Publishing, 2016
 Masini N., Soldovieri F. (Eds), Sensing the Past. From artifact to historical site. Springer International Publishing, 2017.
 [[Ziolkowski M., Masini N., Bastante J. (Eds). Machu Picchu in Context. Interdisciplinary Approaches to the Study of Human Past. Springer International Publishing, 2022

Papers
 Masini N., Lasaponara N., Orefici G. 2009, Addressing the challenge of detecting archaeological adobe structures in Southern Peru using QuickBird imagery, Journal of Cultural Heritage, 10S, pp. 3–9.
 Lasaponara R., Masini N., Rizzo E., Orefici G. 2011. New discoveries in the Piramide Naranjada in Cahuachi (Peru) using satellite, Ground Probing Radar and magnetic investigations, Journal of Archaeological Science, 38, 2031–2039, https://dx.doi.org/10.1016/j.jas.2010.12.010
 Lasaponara R., Masini N. 2014. Beyond modern landscape features: New insights in the archaeological area of Tiwanaku in Bolivia from satellite data. International Journal of Applied Earth Observation and Geoinformation, 26, 464–471, https://dx.doi.org/10.1016/j.jag.2013.09.00.
 Masini N., Orefici G. et al. 2016. Cahuachi and Pampa de Atarco: Towards Greater Comprehension of Nasca Geoglyphs. In: Lasaponara R., Masini N., Orefici G. (Eds). The Ancient Nasca World New Insights from Science and Archaeology. Springer International Publishing, 2016, pp. 239–278, doi: 10.1007/978-3-319-47052-8_12
 Jiang A., Chen F., Masini N. et al. (2016), Archeological crop marks identified from Cosmo-SkyMed time series: the case of Han-Wei capital city, Luoyang, China. International Journal of Digital Earth, 10(8), 846–860.
 Masini, N., Gizzi, F. T. et al. 2018. Medieval Archaeology Under the Canopy with LiDAR. The (Re)Discovery of a Medieval Fortified Settlement in Southern Italy, in Remote Sensing, 10, 1598, doi: 10.3390/rs10101598
 Masini, N., Lasaponara, R.2019. Satellite and close range analysis for the surveillance and knowledge improvement of the Nasca geoglyphs. Remote Sensing of Environment, 236, Article number 111447

Bibliography 
 Aimi A., Arqueólogos Intelectuales Italianos en el Peru. Instituto Italiano de Cultura de Lima, Lima, 2015, pp. 47–48.
 Sartini R., Passa per lo Spazio la nuova Via della Seta. "Il Nodo di Gordio", 4 (2014), pp. 27–33.

References

External links 
 http://www.archeo.unict.it/index.php/progetti-archeounict/peru-archeounict
 http://pachacamac.cultura.pe/foto/tecnologias-en-la-arqueologia-de-pachacamac-utilizacion-de-drones-georadares-y-aparatos-de
 http://archive.wikiwix.com/cache/20170406000000/http://www.nationalgeographic.it/wallpaper/2017/04/06/foto/nazca_le_nuove_linee_nel_deserto_peruviano-3485155/1/
 https://www.ispc.cnr.it/it_it/2020/11/05/missione-itaca/

1965 births
Living people
21st-century Italian scientists
Remote sensing archaeologists